Descartes is a heavily worn lunar impact crater that is located in the rugged south-central highlands of the Moon. To the southwest is the crater Abulfeda.  It is named after the French philosopher, mathematician and physicist René Descartes.

The rim of Descartes survives only in stretches, and is completely missing in the north. The crater Descartes A lies across the southwest rim. The interior floor contains several curved ridges. These are concentric with the surviving outer walls to the northwest and southeast.

A section of the outer rim of Descartes is covered by a region that has a higher albedo than the surrounding surface. Low-altitude measurements by the Lunar Prospector showed that this patch is actually a magnetic anomaly—the strongest on the near side of the Moon. This magnetic field may be deflecting particles from the solar wind, and thus preventing the underlying surface from growing darker because of space weathering.  This is similar to the process causing Reiner Gamma and other bright swirls such as those of Mare Marginis and Mare Ingenii.

About 50 kilometers to the north of this crater was the landing site of Apollo 16. The uneven region about the landing area is sometimes called the Descartes Highlands or the Descartes Mountains.

Satellite craters
By convention these features are identified on lunar maps by placing the letter on the side of the crater midpoint that is closest to Descartes.

References

External links

Descartes at The Moon Wiki
 
 

Impact craters on the Moon
René Descartes